Bela Lyon Pratt (December 11, 1867 – May 18, 1917) was an American sculptor from Connecticut.

Life
Pratt was born in Norwich, Connecticut, to Sarah (Whittlesey) and George Pratt, a Yale-educated lawyer. His maternal grandfather, Oramel Whittlesey, was a pianoforte maker and founder in 1835 of Music Vale Seminary in Salem, Connecticut, the first music school in the country authorized to confer degrees to teach music. At 16, Pratt began studying at the Yale University School of Fine Arts, where his teachers included John Henry Niemeyer (1839–1932) and John Ferguson Weir (1841–1926).

After graduating from Yale, he enrolled at the Art Students League of New York where he took classes from William Merritt Chase (1849–1916), Kenyon Cox (1859–1919), Francis Edwin Elwell (1858–1922), and most important, Augustus Saint-Gaudens (1848–1907), who became his mentor. After a short stint in Saint-Gaudens' private studio, Pratt traveled to Paris, where he trained with sculptors Henri-Michel-Antoine Chapu (1833–1891) and Alexandre Falguière (1831–1900) at the École des Beaux-Arts.

In 1892, he returned to the United States to create two large sculptural groups representing The Genius of Navigation for the World's Columbian Exposition in Chicago. He also produced sculptures for the Pan-American Exposition at Buffalo in 1901.  In 1893, he began a 25-year career as an influential teacher of modeling in the School of the Museum of Fine Arts, Boston. One of Pratt's most famous students at the School was John A. Wilson. During this time, Pratt sculpted a series of busts of Boston's intellectual community, including Episcopal minister Phillips Brooks (1899, Brooks House, Harvard University), Colonel Henry Lee (1902, Memorial Hall, Harvard University), and Boston Symphony Orchestra founder Henry Lee Higginson (1909, Symphony Hall, Boston).  He became an associate of the National Academy in 1900.  (1)

When Saint-Gaudens' uncompleted group for the entrance to the Boston Public Library was rejected, Pratt was awarded a commission for personifications of Art and Science. Pratt continued Saint-Gaudens' influence in coin design after 1907. His gold Indian Head half ($5) and quarter ($2.50) eagle gold U.S. coins are known as the "Pratt coins" and feature an unusual intaglio Indian head, the U.S. mint's only recessed design in circulation. A memorial exhibition of 125 of his sculptures was held at the Museum of Fine Arts, Boston in the spring of 1918.

Pratt's students included Frederick Warren Allen, Daisy Blanche King., Bashka Paeff, and Richard Henry Recchia, as well as his son Dudley Pratt.

Selected works 

 1892 The Genius of Navigation – World's Columbian Exposition
 1892 The Genius of Discovery – World's Columbian Exposition
 1893 Clara and Lizzie, Daughters of Frederick and Elizabeth Shattuck (plaque) – National Gallery of Art
 1895 Literature, Science, Art (Spandrel figures) Thomas Jefferson Building, Library of Congress, Washington, DC
 1896 The Four Seasons (plaques) – 2nd floor pavilions, Thomas Jefferson Building, Library of Congress
1896 Figure of Victory - #1 turret U.S.S. Massachusetts, (Sculpture now housed at the US Naval Academy in Annapolis, Maryland).
 1897 Dr. Henry Augustus Coit – St. Paul's School, Concord, New Hampshire
 1902 General Benjamin Franklin Butler Monument - Hildreth Cemetery, Lowell, Massachusetts
 1906 Young Soldier – St. Paul's School, Concord, New Hampshire
 1907 Andersonville Boy – State Capitol Grounds, Hartford, Connecticut
 1908 Abraham Lincoln Monument – Lowell, Massachusetts
 1910 Soldiers' and Sailors' Monument, Bell Rock Memorial Park, Malden, Massachusetts
 1910 Nathaniel Hawthorne – Salem, Massachusetts
 1910 Art w/palette right, Science w/sphere left, Boston Public Library, Boston, Massachusetts
 Army Nurses Memorial
 1913 Whaleman's Monument – New Bedford, Massachusetts
 1913 Edward Everett Hale – Boston Public Garden, Boston, Massachusetts
 1913 Schoolboy Statue of 1850 –  Ashburnham, MA
 1914 Grieving Mother - Washington Memorial Chapel, Valley Forge National Historical Park, Pennsylvania
 1914 Captain Nathan Hale – Yale University
Central Intelligence Agency, Quantico, Virginia 
Department of Justice Building, Washington, D.C.
Chicago Tribune, Chicago, Illinois
Fort Nathan Hale, New Haven, Connecticut
 1916 Reverend Phillips Brooks, Old Common, North Andover, Massachusetts

Gallery

References 
 Downes, William Howe. "The Work of Bela L. Pratt, Sculptor." New England Magazine 27 (February 1903): 760–771.
 Coburn, Frederick W. "Americanism in Sculpture. As Represented in the Works of Bela Lyon Pratt." Palette and Bench 2, nos. 5 and 6 (February–March 1910): 95–97, 127–131.
 Dorr, Charles Henry. "Bela L. Pratt: An Eminent New England Sculptor." Architectural Record 35, no. 6 (June 1914): 508–518.
 Obituary, The New York Times (19 May 1917).
 Taft, Lorado. The History of American Sculpture, New York, 1924: 491–496.

Specific

External links

 AAAS  Names of members
 

1867 births
1917 deaths
Yale School of Art alumni
People from Norwich, Connecticut
American alumni of the École des Beaux-Arts
Sculptors from Connecticut
Art Students League of New York alumni
School of the Museum of Fine Arts at Tufts faculty
20th-century American sculptors
20th-century American male artists
19th-century American sculptors
19th-century male artists
Sculptors from New York (state)
Artists of the Boston Public Library
American currency designers
Coin designers
19th-century American male artists